Nazook (also spelled nazuk or nazouk, Armenian Նազուկ) is the name of an Armenian pastry made from flour, butter, sugar, sour cream, yeast, vanilla extract and eggs, with a filling often made with nuts, and especially walnuts.  Nazook is sometimes referred to as gata.

See also
 Gata (food)
 List of pastries

References

Armenian pastries
Armenian desserts
Nut dishes
Stuffed desserts